The men's road race took place at 26 March 2006 on a route through the Royal Botanic Gardens. The race length was 166 km.

Results
The notation "s.t." indicates that the rider crossed the finish line in the same group as the one receiving the time above him, and was therefore credited with the same finishing time.

Did Not Finish

Danny Lloyd Laud
Charles Bryan
Kris Pradel
Ronnie Bryan

Ben Day
Aaron Kemps
Peter Dawson

Robert Frances Marsh
Ken Manassah Jackson
Lynn Byron Murray

Barron Musgrove
Jonathan David Massie

Jason Perryman
Philip Clarke

Gregory Lovell
Ian Smith
Mateo Cruz
Roger Troyer

Geri Bryan Mewett

Damien Tekou Foukou
Sadrac Teguimaha
Flaubert Douanla
Martinien Tega
Pascal Bouba

Geoff Kabush
Francois Parisien

Duke Perrigoff Merren

Ian Stannard
Chris Newton
Robin Sharman
Paul Manning

Tobyn Scott Horton
Robert James Smart

Jude Nathaniel Bentley
Warren Christopher McKay

Mark Richard Kelly
Graeme Hatcher
Andrew William James Cook

Horace McFarlane
Oniel Samuels
Tinga Turner

Sam Firby

Simon Nyoike Ng'ang'a-
Michael Nziani Muthui
Davidson Kamau Kihagi
Peter Kamau

Poloko Makara
Tumisang Taabe
Moeketsi Makatile
Makhashe Ramolungoa
Khotso Ntsema
Tekanyane Moubane

Sayuti Zahit
Muhammad Fauzan Ahmad Lufti
Mohd Jasmin Ruslan

Nicholas Formosa
Etienne Bonello
Giocondo Schiavone

Yolain Calypso
Thomas Desvaux
Colin Mayer
Christophe Lincoln

Michael Swanepoel
Marc Bassingthwaighte
Mannie Heymans

Logan Hutchings
Gordon McCauley

Lewis Ferguson

Muhammad Saleem
Imran Sharif

Evan Oliphant
Robert Wardell
Gareth Montgomerie
James McCallum

Hedson Mathieu

Jeremy Paul Maartens
Rupert Rheeder

Marlon Andre Antrobus

David Kigongo
David Magezi

Matt Brammeier
Geraint Thomas
Yanto Barker
Julian Winn
Dale Appleby
Rob Partridge

Hilarry Moono Ng'Ake
James Malako

External links
 Results

Cycling at the 2006 Commonwealth Games
Road cycling at the Commonwealth Games